The Argentina women's national volleyball team represents Argentina in international women's volleyball and is controlled by the Argentine Volleyball Federation (Federación del Voleibol Argentino in Spanish, and abbreviated "FeVA").

It participates in the Summer Olympics, the world championships, and other international tournaments.

Results

Olympic Games
 2016 — 9th place
 2020 — 11th place

World Championship
 1960 — 8th place
 1982 — 18th place
 1990 — 15th place
 2002 — 17th place
 2014 — 17th place
 2018 — 19th place
 2022 — 16th place

FIVB World Cup
 1973 — 8th place
 1999 — 11th place
 2003 — 11th place
 2011 — 10th place
 2015 — 8th place
 2019 — 10th place

FIVB World Grand Prix
 2011 — 14th place
 2012 — 15th place
 2013 — 16th place
 2014 — 17th place
 2015 — 19th place
 2016 — 17th place
 2017 — 22nd place

FIVB Nations League
 2018 — 16th place

Pan American Games
 1983 — 6th place
 1991 — 6th place
 1995 — 4th place
 2015 — 6th place
 2019 — 3rd place  Bronze Medal

Pan-American Cup
2002 — 5th place
2004 — 8th place
2005 — 9th place
2006 — 10th place
2007 — 6th place
2008 — 3rd place  Bronze Medal
2009 — 6th place
2010 — 5th place
2011 — 6th place
2012 — 5th place
2013 — 3rd place  Bronze Medal
2014 — 4th place
2015 — 3rd place  Bronze Medal
2016 — 5th place
2017 — 8th place
2018 — 9th place

Final Four Cup
2008 — 3rd place
2010 — 3rd place

South American Championship
 1951 — 4th place
 1958 — 5th place
 1961 — 3rd place  Bronze Medal
 1962 — 3rd place  Bronze Medal
 1964 — 3rd place  Bronze Medal
 1969 — 5th place
 1971 — 6th place
 1973 — 6th place
 1975 — 3rd place  Bronze Medal
 1977 — 3rd place  Bronze Medal
 1979 — 3rd place  Bronze Medal
 1981 — 3rd place  Bronze Medal
 1983 — 3rd place  Bronze Medal
 1987 — 4th place
 1989 — 3rd place  Bronze Medal
 1991 — 4th place
 1995 — 3rd place  Bronze Medal
 1997 — 3rd place  Bronze Medal
 1999 — 2nd place  Silver Medal
 2001 — 2nd place  Silver Medal
 2003 — 2nd place  Silver Medal
 2005 — 3rd place  Bronze Medal
 2007 — 5th place
 2009 — 2nd place  Silver Medal
 2011 — 2nd place  Silver Medal
 2013 — 2nd place  Silver Medal
 2015 — 4th place
 2017 — 4th place
 2019 — 4th place
 2021 — 3rd place  Bronze Medal

Team

Current squad
The following is the Argentinian roster in the 2020 Summer Olympics.

Head coach: Hernán Ferraro

Fromer squads
1999 FIVB World Cup — 11th place
Mirna Ansaldi, Monica Bahnson, Carolina Costagrande, Mariana Conde, Celina Crusoe, Florencia Delfino, Monica Kostolnik, Romina Lamas, Ivana Müller, Marcela Re, Marcia Scacchi, and Laura Vincente. Head coach: Claudio Cuello.
 2002 World Championship — 17th place
Mirna Ansaldi, Julietta Borghi, Natalia Brussa, Carolina Costagrande, Mariana Conde, Celina Crusoe, Romina Lamas, Ivana Müller, Georgina Pinedo, Marianela Robinet, Laura Vincente, and Micaela Vogel. Head coach: Claudio Cuello.
 2003 FIVB World Cup — 11th place
Julietta Borghi, Mariana Burgos, Maia Constant, Sandra Kobetic, Monica Kostolnik, Natalia Mildenberger, Karina Pacheco, María Paredes, Paula Parisi, Georgina Pinedo, Daniela Preiti, and María Vincente. Head coach: Hugo Jauregui.
 2008 Pan-American Cup — 3rd place
Mirna Ansaldi, Leticia Boscacci, Yael Castiglione, Natalia Espinosa, Natali Flaviani, Georgina Klug, Ileana Leyendeker, Yamila Nizetich, Georgina Pinedo, Tatiana Rizzo, Marianela Robinet, and Sabrina Segui. Head coach: Horacio Bastit.
 2016 Summer Olympics — 9th place'
Tanya Acosta, Yamila Nizetich, Lucía Fresco, Clarisa Sagardía, Emilce Sosa, Julieta Lazcano, Tatiana Rizzo, Leticia Boscacci, Josefina Fernández, Florencia Busquets, Yael Castiglione, Morena Franchi. Head coach''': Guillermo Orduna

References

External links
 
FIVB profile

Volleyball
National women's volleyball teams
Volleyball in Argentina